Adolphus Nagbe Marshall (born 21 July 1992) is a Liberian footballer who plays for Maltese club St. George's F.C.

Career

Indonesia
Recalled to PS Bangka early December 2013, Nagbe was described as being good in aerial duels and having the ideal height for a defender while being examined at PSMS Medan. However, he was threatened to be deported due to immigration issues but it never happened.

Provoked and taunted by the PSMS Medan starters on the 14th of February 2014, the centerback still concentrated on the match they were unable to elicit a reaction from him.

Malta
Spending 2017/18 with Gudja United, the Liberia international focused on promotion that season and was nominated for the 2nd Division Player of the Year Award.

References

External links
 Maltese Football Association Profile

PSMS Medan players
Liberian footballers
Liberian expatriate footballers
Association football defenders
Living people
Expatriate footballers in Malta
1988 births
Deltras F.C. players
Expatriate footballers in Indonesia
PSIR Rembang players
Gudja United F.C. players
Sportspeople from Monrovia
Liberia international footballers